Melvin Carter may refer to:
 Melvin Carter (politician), first African-American mayor of St. Paul, Minnesota
 Melvin Carter (criminal), serial rapist in California